John Tennent may refer to:
 John Tennent (courtier)
 John Tennent (cricketer)
 John Tennent (footballer)

See also
 John Tennant (disambiguation)